Kristine Leschper is an American musician from Athens, Georgia, now based in Philadelphia, Pennsylvania. Leschper is best known as the former frontwoman of Mothers.

Career
Leschper began her career writing solo music under the moniker "Mothers" in the early 2010s. However, the project soon turned into a full band, and they released two albums as a group before breaking up. Leschper moved from Athens to Philadelphia in 2018. Leschper said that anxiety and depression ensued after the last Mothers album and tour. 
During the COVID-19 pandemic, Leschper decided to return to her early days as a solo musician and begin working on new material. In late 2021, Leschper emerged with the announcement of her first solo album, The Opening, or Closing of a Door. When discussing why Leschper decided to become a solo artist, she said:

The album was released on March 4, 2022 through Anti-, and received positive reviews.

References

Living people
21st-century American musicians
21st-century American women musicians
Musicians from Athens, Georgia
Year of birth missing (living people)